Anthony Eugene Anderson (born September 27, 1956) is a former professional American football running back. He played for two seasons in the National Football League (NFL) for the Pittsburgh Steelers, where he won a Super Bowl ring in Super Bowl XIV against the Los Angeles Rams, and also played with the Atlanta Falcons. Anderson played for the Philadelphia Stars of the United States Football League (USFL) in the 1983 season.

Playing career
Anderson attended Thomas McKean High School where he was a two-time All-Stater. In 1994, Anderson was inducted into the Delaware Sports Museum and Hall of Fame and was also inducted into Temple University Hall of Fame. Anderson was at the time the second leading ground-gainer in Temple football history. Anderson earned the All-East and All-American awards while at Temple.

As part of the nationwide kickoff to the Super Bowl 50 celebration, the NFL launched today the Super Bowl High School Honor Roll initiative recognizing schools and communities that contributed to Super Bowl history and positively impacted the game of football. On January 11, 2016, Anderson received this honor at Thomas McKean high School. That night, the high school also retired his jersey number.

Personal life
Anderson owns a construction company in Delaware and does motivational speaking engagements. Anderson had a small role in the made-for-TV movie, Fighting Back a story about Rocky Bleier. Anthony Anderson has a son named Anthony Brown who was a running back that played football for Wesley College in Dover, Delaware

References

1956 births
Living people
American football running backs
Atlanta Falcons players
Philadelphia/Baltimore Stars players
Pittsburgh Steelers players
Players of American football from Wilmington, Delaware
Temple Owls football players